Marcus Hamilton may refer to:

 Marcus Hamilton (Angel), a character from the TV series Angel
 Marcus Hamilton (American football) (born 1984), American football cornerback